Mayoral elections took place in the Turkish Province of Hakkari alongside nationwide local elections on 30 March 2014. A total of 8 municipalities were up for election, consisting of one central district municipality, two district municipalities and three belde (town) municipalities. The Hakkari central district Municipality was won by the Peace and Democracy Party (BDP).

Results

References

2014 Turkish local elections